Alimin bin Prawirodirdjo (1889 – 24 June 1964) was an Indonesian independence movement figure and also Indonesian communist.

Since he was a teenager Alimin was active on national movements. He was a member of Budi Utomo, Sarekat Islam, Insulinde, before he joined with the Communist Party of Indonesia (PKI) and eventually he became leader of the organization. He was also founder of Sarekat Buruh Pelabuhan (formerly called Sarekat Pegawai Pelabuhan dan Lautan).

In early 1926, as the leader of the PKI, Alimin went to Singapore to negotiate with Tan Malaka in order to prepare rebellion. But, before Alimin went home, the rebellion broke out on 12 November 1926. Alimin and Musso were arrested by British colonial police.

References 

1964 deaths
1889 births
People from Surakarta
National Heroes of Indonesia
Sarekat Islam politicians
Communist Party of Indonesia politicians
Muslim socialists